H. Paul Dennert is a Democratic member of the South Dakota House of Representatives, representing District 2 since 2005. He earlier served in the House from 1993 through 1996, and the South Dakota Senate from 1997 through 2004.

External links
South Dakota Legislature – H. Paul Dennert official SD House website

Project Vote Smart – Representative Paul Dennert (SD) profile
Follow the Money – Paul Dennert
2008 2006 2004 House campaign contributions
2002 2000 Senate campaign contributions

Democratic Party members of the South Dakota House of Representatives
Democratic Party South Dakota state senators
1937 births
Living people
Farmers from South Dakota
People from Brown County, South Dakota
American cattlemen